Socialist Alliance of Andalusia (ASA) was a clandestine left-wing Andalusian nationalist political organization from Andalusia (Spain), active during the last years of Francoism.

History
ASA emerged in 1971 at a meeting in Mairena del Alcor in which Alejandro Rojas-Marcos, Luis Uruñuela, Guillermo Jiménez Sánchez, Diego de los Santos, Juan Carlos Aguilar, Ángel Tarancón, Rafael Illescas and Fermín Rodríguez Sañudo, all members of the Compromiso Político de Andalucía group (created in 1965) were present. ASA was the first Andalusian nationalist organization that emerged after the murder of Blas Infante in 1936.

In June 1976, ASA held the "1st Andalusian Congress" at the University of Málaga, which marked the official exit from clandestinity and a reorganization of the nationalist movement, which became the Socialist Party of Andalusia (PSA). One of the most notorious actions of the ASA was the edition of the manifesto "Por un Poder Andaluz" (For an Andalusian power) in 1976, in which it is claimed that Andalusia "must be legally configured through a Statute of Autonomy" as "the only possible way to end political dependence and economic and social exploitation."

See also
 Andalucista Party
 Andalusian nationalism

References

1965 establishments in Andalusia
1976 disestablishments in Andalusia
Andalusian nationalist parties
Defunct nationalist parties in Spain
Defunct socialist parties in Spain
Left-wing nationalist parties
Political parties established in 1965
Political parties disestablished in 1976
Political parties in Andalusia